The Clay County Courthouse, Eastern District is located at Courthouse Square in the center of Piggott, one of two county seats of Clay County, Arkansas (the other is Corning). It is a single-story masonry structure, built out of concrete with brick facing. The main facade is symmetrical, with a recessed entrance area sheltered by a portico with a zigzag roof. The courthouse was built in 1966–67 to a design by Donnellan & Porterfield, replacing an 1890s Romanesque courthouse designed by Charles L. Thompson. Both this courthouse and that in Corning were built in the wake of a fire which destroyed the old Corning courthouse, and both were designed by Donnellan & Porterfield. Both are locally prominent examples of New Formalism style of Modern architecture.

It is a contributing building in the Piggott Commercial Historic District, which was listed on the National Register of Historic Places in 2009.  It was listed individually on the National Register in 2018.

See also
National Register of Historic Places listings in Clay County, Arkansas

References

Courthouses on the National Register of Historic Places in Arkansas
Government buildings completed in 1968
Buildings and structures in Clay County, Arkansas
Courthouses in Arkansas
National Register of Historic Places in Clay County, Arkansas
Historic district contributing properties in Arkansas